West Point is the westernmost point in Seattle, Washington, United States, jutting into Puget Sound from the Magnolia neighborhood. It also marks the northern extent of Elliott Bay; a line drawn southeastward to Alki Point marks the western extent of the bay. At the point itself is the 1881 West Point Lighthouse, the first manned light station on Puget Sound. Just to the east is King County's sewage treatment plant, and beyond that, Discovery Park, formerly the U.S. Army's Fort Lawton.

The original Duwamish Native American name for West Point, transliterated variously as PKa'dz Elue, Oka-dz-elt-cu, Per-co-dus-chule, or Pka-dzEltcu, means "thrust far out." West Point was given its current name in 1841 by U.S. Navy lieutenant Charles Wilkes, commander of the United States Exploring Expedition.

In 1992, construction of an expansion to the sewage treatment plant unearthed archaeological remains of early Coast Salish peoples, including artifacts from 4,200 years ago.

Notes

External links

 West Point Lighthouse

Archaeology of West Point

Landforms of Seattle
Headlands of Washington (state)
Landforms of King County, Washington
Magnolia, Seattle
Elliott Bay